The House of Yes is a 1997 American dark comedy film adapted from the play of the same name by Wendy MacLeod. The film was written and directed by Mark Waters (in his directing debut), produced by Robert Berger, and stars Parker Posey, Josh Hamilton, Tori Spelling, Freddie Prinze Jr. and Geneviève Bujold. It was released in the United States by Miramax Films on October 10, 1997. The House of Yes received a divided critical reaction, with Posey winning a Sundance Award and Spelling receiving a Razzie Award nomination.

Plot
On Thanksgiving in 1983, Marty Pascal travels from New York City to McLean, Virginia, to visit his family: mother Mrs. Pascal, younger brother Anthony, and twin sister "Jackie-O". Jackie-O, recently released from a psychiatric hospital, is obsessed with Jacqueline Kennedy Onassis and emulates her style of dress and hairstyle. Marty surprises his family with news he is engaged; he introduces his fiancée Lesly, a waitress at a doughnut store. Lesly's arrival disrupts the family's gathering, and Jackie-O conspires to break the couple up.

It becomes apparent that Marty and Jackie-O were involved in an incestuous relationship as teenagers. Jackie-O convinces Marty to play their favorite childhood "game", involving using a gun loaded with blanks to re-enact the Kennedy assassination; the "game" serves as foreplay for sex. A horrified Lesly witnesses the encounter and speaks to Anthony, who had tried to warn her of the nature of Marty and Jackie's relationship. He convinces Lesly that he is a virgin and dying of a brain tumor, leading to a brief and awkward sexual encounter.

In the morning, Lesly confronts Marty about what she witnessed. Marty breaks down and begs Lesly to return to New York with him. Jackie-O convinces Marty that she will let him leave if he agrees to play the game one final time. Armed with the gun, Jackie-O recalls the events that led to their absent father's departure; Marty claims that he walked out on the family the day of the Kennedy assassination, but Jackie-O believes that he was shot by Mrs. Pascal and buried in the backyard. Jackie-O fires the gun at Marty, now loaded with real bullets, killing him. Footage of Jackie Kennedy is then shown as Lesly screams. Lesly runs from the house and a flashback of Jackie-O in her costume as a teen is being filmed by Marty as she asks him to “stop it.”

Cast
 Parker Posey as "Jackie-O" Pascal
 Rachael Leigh Cook as young "Jackie-O"
 Josh Hamilton as Marty Pascal
 David Love as the voice of young Marty
 Tori Spelling as Lesly
 Freddie Prinze Jr. as Anthony Pascal
 Geneviève Bujold as Mrs. Pascal

Production and release
The film was reportedly financed entirely by Tori Spelling's father Aaron Spelling and his company Spelling Entertainment.  It premiered at the 1997 Sundance Film Festival, where its screening attracted the interest of Miramax. According to Variety, Miramax paid two million dollars to acquire the distribution rights to the film. The House of Yes was given a limited theatrical release beginning on October 10, 1997. The film was a box-office disappointment, grossing only $626,057 on its $1.5 million budget.

Reception
On Rotten Tomatoes the film has an approval rating of 62% based on 39 reviews. On Metacritic the film has a score of 58% based on reviews from 16 critics, indicating "mixed or average reviews". 

Siskel and Ebert gave the film two thumbs down on the October 25, 1997 episode of their program. Roger Ebert looked upon the film more favorably in his review for the Chicago Sun-Times, stating "The dialogue, adapted by director Mark Waters from Wendy MacLeod's stage play, is smart and terse, with a lot of back-and-forth word play, most of it driven by Jackie-O, who is played by Posey as smart, dark and fresh out of an institution [...] While it was running, I was not bored." 

In his positive review for Entertainment Weekly, Owen Gleiberman wrote that "The House of Yes is knowingly overripe, a kitsch melodrama that dares to make incest sexy." He also praised the casting of Posey, noting that "Parker Posey may never have a role that suits her as perfectly." Of Spelling, Dennis Harvey of Variety wrote, "Casting Spelling as the fiancee was an inspired stroke, as auds already associate her with a certain cluelessness but she’s actually quite good, too, as Lesly gradually reveals a surprising determination beneath her squarer-than-square surface." The Austin Chronicle acknowledged the strong performances of the cast, but stated, "it's just that there's really not all that much for them to do." 

For her performance, Posey was awarded a Special Recognition for Acting Award at Sundance.

References

External links
 
 
 

1997 films
Sundance Film Festival award winners
American independent films
1997 independent films
American films based on plays
Twins in American films
Incest in film
Films directed by Mark Waters
Films about bipolar disorder
Films about dysfunctional families
American black comedy films
1990s black comedy films
Films set in Virginia
Films set in 1983
Films set in Washington, D.C.
Thanksgiving in films
Films produced by Beau Flynn
Cultural depictions of Jacqueline Kennedy Onassis
Spelling Films films
Films scored by Rolfe Kent
1997 directorial debut films
1997 comedy films
1990s English-language films
1990s American films